Homicho Ammunition Engineering Complex is the part of Metals and Engineering Corporation and is also one of the military production facilities of the Ethiopian Defense Industry Sector. It specializes in producing wide range of ammunition for use by the Ethiopian National Defense Force.

History
The Complex was established around 1987 under the name Tatek Engineering Factory with the goal of producing ammunition for medium and heavy weapons. It initially produced mortar shells but was later greatly expanded to produce a wide range of ammunition. In addition, the light weapons ammunition production line was transferred from Hibret Machine Tools Engineering Complex in a restructuring to house all ammunition production under one organization. The new organization was renamed Homicho Ammunition Engineering Complex in 2004.

Structure
The complex has four departments with 1,480 personnel out of which 192 of them are military and 1,288 are civil.

Research and development
The complex collaborates closely with the Defense Engineering College and various higher learning institutes. It has undertaken various works to improve the quality of military ammunition.

Products
The center produces wide range of ammunition ranging from light weapons to heavy mortars and artillery.  It also produces various metal products that are inputs to civil industries.

References
FDRE Defense Industry, May 2008
Homicho Ammunition Engineering Complex profile 

Military industrial facilities of Ethiopia